Petropedetes perreti is a species of frog in the family Petropedetidae. It is endemic to Cameroon. It is known from the southern slopes of the Bamiléké Plateau, Mount Manengouba, and Mount Nlonako. Common name Perret's water frog has been coined for it.

Etymology
The specific name perreti honours , a Swiss herpetologist who has specialized in African amphibians.

Description
Males measure  and females  in snout–vent length; it is a medium-sized member of its genus. The body is slender. The tympanum is distinct and nearly as large as the eye in males but distinctly smaller in females. The canthus rostralis is distinct but slightly rounded. The dorsum is brownish or greenish marbled with black parts, or more or less uniformly dark, and speckled with white minuscule spots. The hands are unwebbed whereas the feet are fully webbed.

Habitat and conservation
Adults have been found adhering with their bellies and limbs to stones in strong currents, sitting on stones amidst the river or some meters away from water, and on leaves of plants on the river sides. The egg clutches are deposited on rocks within the splash zone of rapids and waterfalls. The male appears to defend its clutch. The tadpoles can feed in the splash zone and only move to the water when disturbed.

It is threatened by habitat loss caused by agriculture, logging, and human settlements.

References

perreti
Frogs of Africa
Amphibians of Cameroon
Endemic fauna of Cameroon
Amphibians described in 1973
Taxonomy articles created by Polbot
Fauna of the Cameroonian Highlands forests